Heidi Wiesler (born 28 March 1960 in Staufen im Breisgau) is a German former alpine skier who competed in the 1984 Winter Olympics.

External links
 

1960 births
Living people
People from Staufen im Breisgau
Sportspeople from Freiburg (region)
Olympic alpine skiers of West Germany
Alpine skiers at the 1984 Winter Olympics
German female alpine skiers
20th-century German women